Penglais Nature Park is a woodland situated in Aberystwyth, Ceredigion in Wales.

The park is a combination of woodland and a disused quarry. Spring brings a display of a carpet of bluebells in common with the many other bluebell woods.

External links
 BBC Mid Wales Reserves - Parc Natur Penglais

Aberystwyth
Forests and woodlands of Ceredigion
Nature reserves in Ceredigion